Shuaip Pasha's House was the home of Shuaip Pasha, first Albanian Minister of Finance.  It was located in Prizren, Kosovo, near Old Stone Bridge, at the riverside of Prizrenska Bistrica. The house was built in the early 19th century by Shuaip Aga, a prominent leader of the Albanian League of Prizren, and it was destroyed in 1999. In 2012, under the supervision of Cultural Heritage without Borders organisation, a plan of conservation and reconstruction was presented.

See also 
Assembly of Vlorë

Notes

References

Residential buildings in Kosovo
Houses completed in the 19th century
Ottoman architecture in Kosovo
Buildings and structures in Prizren